Adrian Charles Cuthbert Seligman, DSC (26 November 1909 – 6 August 2003) was a British sailor, writer, and soldier in the Second World War. Seligman would create the Levant Schooner Flotilla naval commando unit in the Aegean Sea.

Early life

Seligman was born in Leatherhead, Surrey to metallurgist Richard Seligman and author and sculptor Hilda Seligman (née McDowell). As a child Seligman attended Rokeby Preparatory School in Kingston upon Thames, London, but learned to sail while his family vacationed in Saint-Jacut-de-la-Mer, Brittany. After failing natural science examinations at the University of Cambridge Seligman took work as a mess boy on a shipping freighter and began a career at sea. While working as a sailor Seligman circumnavigated the globe three times aboard the ships Killoran and Olivebank.

Seligman purchased a 250-ton French fishing Barquentine named Cap Pilar on the advice of Joseph Stenhouse, a commander in the Royal Navy and former participant in Ernest Shackleton's Discovery Expedition. In 1936 Seligman, his wife Jane Batterbury, and a crew of six set out on a voyage to circumnavigate the globe. The project was funded in part by the London daily News Chronicle. The couple had a daughter, Jessica Jane, born in New Zealand during the voyage. In 1939 Seligman published a popular book about the experience, The Voyage of the Cap Pilar.

Naval commando

At the onset of WWII Seligman was a sub-lieutenant in the Royal Naval Reserve. Initially Seligman worked in minesweeping operations and commanded a destroyer. In 1941 Seligman and other reserve officers conducted a special operations mission to bring five ships from Russia to Syria through the German blockade at the Dardanelles. In this mission, Seligman commanded a camouflaged oiltanker called Olinda.

From 1942 to 1944 Seligman commanded the Levant Schooner Flotilla, a special operations group in the Aegean Sea. To accomplish this Seligman disguised Greek fishing caïques while outfitting them with military equipment. Caïques were operated by crews of 5-6 and were armed with 20mm cannons, Browning machine guns and Vickers aircraft machine guns. The vessels often operated under cover of darkness, landing or picking up commandos, rescuing partisans, and intercepting or raiding small German forces. Many ships were powered by Matilda tank engines and used long-range radios taken from Kittyhawk (P-40) fighter aircraft.

Writing and later life

After WWII Seligman lived in Malta and wrote children's books about life at sea. In 1947 he wrote a book about his wartime experiences, No Stars to Guide.

In 1950 he was remarried, to Rosemary Grimble, daughter of British diplomat Sir Arthur Grimble, with whom he had two sons, including bass player Matthew Seligman. In 1958 in London, Seligman founded a technical press agency.

After retirement, in 1994 he published another book on sailing, The Slope of the Wind; in 1996 he published a second account of the war, War in the Islands.

References

1909 births
2003 deaths
English people of German-Jewish descent
Royal Navy personnel of World War II
Royal Naval Reserve personnel